Charles Martin French (June 13, 1876 – June 24, 1972) was an American athlete.  He competed in the 1908 Summer Olympics in London in the 800 metres.

French graduated from Cornell University in 1909 and was a member of the Sphinx Head Society.

He died in St. Petersburg, Florida, United States at age 87.

References

Sources
 
 
 

1876 births
1972 deaths
American male middle-distance runners
Athletes (track and field) at the 1908 Summer Olympics
Cornell University alumni
Olympic track and field athletes of the United States